Caroline Smith (later Macias) (July 21, 1906 – November 11, 1994) was an American diver who competed in the 1924 Summer Olympics.

On the eve of her 18th birthday, July 20, 1924, in Paris, France, Smith won the gold medal in the 10 meter platform competition. She defeated teammate Elizabeth Becker-Pinkston by a half-point in the judges' scoring.

Smith was inducted in the International Swimming Hall of Fame in 1988.

References

External links
profile

1906 births
1994 deaths
Divers at the 1924 Summer Olympics
Olympic gold medalists for the United States in diving
American female divers
Medalists at the 1924 Summer Olympics
20th-century American women
20th-century American people